Donald C. Nugent (born March 7, 1948) is a senior United States district judge of the United States District Court for the Northern District of Ohio.

Education

Nugent was born in Minneapolis, Minnesota. He received his Bachelor of Arts degree from Xavier University in Ohio in 1970. He served in the United States Marine Corps from 1970 to 1971 before being admitted to the Cleveland State University College of Law, where he earned his Juris Doctor in 1974. Nugent received a Master of Judicial Studies from National Judicial College at the University of Nevada, Reno in 1994.

Career

Nugent was in private practice in Cuyahoga County, Ohio from 1974 to 1985. He was an assistant prosecuting attorney of Cuyahoga County from 1975 to 1985 and was a Cuyahoga County Court of Common Pleas judge from 1985 to 1992. He was a judge to the Eighth District Ohio Court of Appeals from 1993 to 1995.

Federal judicial service

President Bill Clinton nominated Nugent to the United States District Court for the Northern District of Ohio on April 27, 1995, to the seat vacated by Thomas Demetrios Lambros. Confirmed by the Senate on June 30, 1995, he received commission the same day. He assumed senior status on January 1, 2017.

In 2014, the U.S. Court of Appeals for the Sixth Circuit removed Nugent from a First Amendment lawsuit because he was "hostile and biased" toward the physician plaintiffs who successfully challenged a state restriction on campaign contributions.

References

External links

1948 births
Living people
Cleveland–Marshall College of Law alumni
Judges of the Ohio District Courts of Appeals
Judges of the United States District Court for the Northern District of Ohio
Ohio state court judges
Lawyers from Cleveland
Lawyers from Minneapolis
United States district court judges appointed by Bill Clinton
United States Marines
Xavier University alumni
20th-century American judges
21st-century American judges